Hot Stuff is a 1956 short subject directed by Jules White starring American slapstick comedy team The Three Stooges (Moe Howard, Larry Fine and Shemp Howard). It is the 172nd entry in the series released by Columbia Pictures starring the comedians, who released 190 shorts for the studio between 1934 and 1959.

Plot
The Stooges are secret agents working undercover at the home of Professor Sneed (Emil Sitka) and his daughter (Christine McIntyre). Sneed is developing a rocket fuel in secret for the government. Captain Rork (Philip Van Zandt) of the "State of Anemia" watches the professor through his front window, with hopes of kidnapping him. Of course, Rork and his henchmen capture the Stooges instead, mistaking Larry for the professor. Trouble brews when the Stooges are required to whip up some of the fuel, and then write down the formula. It does not take long for the kidnappers to capture the real Professor Sneed, along with his daughter, and throw them all in jail until the formula is disclosed. As Rork serves the Stooges their last meal, they knock him out and steal the jail keys from him and use their fake fuel to break themselves, Professor Sneed, and his daughter out of the jail and make a quick exit. The exhaust blast is so strong that it tears the uniforms off the Anemia soldiers leaving them in their underwear.

Cast

Credited
 Moe Howard as Moe
 Larry Fine as Larry
 Shemp Howard as Shemp (stock footage)
 Emil Sitka as Professor Sneed (stock footage)
 Christine McIntyre as Hazel Sneed (stock footage)
 Philip Van Zandt as Captain Rork

Uncredited
 Joe Palma as Shemp(new footage)
 Gene Roth as Anemian official
 Connie Cezon as Uranian officer
 Evelyn Lovequist as Uranian officer
 Suzanne Ridgeway as Woman in hallway
 Vernon Dent as General (stock footage)
 Jacques O'Mahoney as Cell Guard (stock footage)
 Hans Schumm as Colonel Cluttz (stock footage)
 Harold Brauer as Leon (stock footage)
 Blackie Whiteford as Anemian soldier (stock footage)
 Jimmy Aubrey as Anemian soldier (stock footage)

Production notes
The short is a remake of 1949's Fuelin' Around, using ample stock footage. Hot Stuff was one of four shorts filmed in the wake of Shemp Howard's death using earlier footage and a stand-in.

"Fake Shemp"

As Shemp Howard had already died, for his last four films (Rumpus in the Harem, Hot Stuff, Scheming Schemers and Commotion on the Ocean), Columbia utilized supporting actor Joe Palma to be Shemp's double. Even though the last four shorts were remakes of earlier Shemp efforts, Palma's services were needed to link what few new scenes were filmed to the older stock footage.

For Hot Stuff, Palma is seen twice. The first time occurs when the Stooges, disguised in beards, are trolling through office hallways. Moe instructs Shemp to pursue a suspicious looking girl, to which Palma grunts "Right!" He then walks off-camera, allowing Moe and Larry to finish the scene by themselves. This is the only time Palma allowed his face to be seen on-camera. As he was purposely wearing a beard, his face is successfully concealed. Later, Palma is seen from the back while the boys are locked in the laboratory. Palma attempts to imitate Shemp's famed cry of "Heep, heep, heep!". Again, Moe directs Shemp, this time to guard the door. Palma obliges, mutters a few additional "Heep, heep, heeps!," and conveniently hides behind the door. This was one of the few times during his tenure as Shemp's double that Palma was required to speak without the aid of dubbing.

See also
List of American films of 1956

References

External links
 
 
Hot Stuff at threestooges.net

1956 films
The Three Stooges films
American black-and-white films
The Three Stooges film remakes
American slapstick comedy films
American comedy thriller films
American spy comedy films
American mystery films
Films directed by Jules White
Films set in Europe
1950s spy comedy films
Columbia Pictures short films
1956 comedy films
1950s English-language films
1950s American films